The Migrant Offshore Aid Station (MOAS) is an international humanitarian non-governmental organization based in Malta that provides aid and emergency medical relief to refugees and migrants.

Most activities between 2014 and 2017 have focused on sea-rescue of refugees and migrants, some 2017 activities have centered around healthcare to Rohingya refugees in Bangladesh.

History

MOAS was founded in 2013 by Italian businesswoman Regina Catrambone and her American husband Chris Catrambone, after Regina found the lifejacket of a refugee who had drowned on the journey from North Africa to Europe. 

MOAS has been awarded Italy's Order of Merit and Malta's Medal for Service for the Republic (Midalja għall-Qadi tar-Repubblika). MOAS also received an award from Civic Engagement by the Today Public Policy Institute in November 2015. In 2016, MOAS received The Geuzen Medal.

Activities

2014 mission in the Central Mediterranean 
The first activities was a 21-day mission of the MY Phoenix vessel that commenced on 25 August 2014, the first rescue was a Maltese fisherman whose boat was drifting off Delimara (close to Marsaxlokk) after its engine failed. The man managed to attract the attention of the MOAS crew by waving. The three-metre fishing vessel was tied up alongside the Phoenix until help was called.

MOAS organized its first migrant rescue on 30 August when it assisted a group of 250 Syrians and Palestinians, including 40 children. On the same day, the Phoenix also assisted 96 people travelling from Sub-Saharan Africa in a rubber dinghy who were transferred onto a merchant ship. On 8 September, the Phoenix conducted two rescues involving almost 700 people migrants, 83 women and children. A two-day-old infant was among the people rescued.

On the subsequent day, another 500 migrants were rescued from two separate vessels, bringing the tally up to 1,500 migrants saved in less than two weeks at sea. MOAS rescued another 1,500 migrants throughout October, bringing the total number of rescues to 3,000. 

MOAS launched a crowdfunding effort in October and by 2015 raised $70,000. In February 2015, MOAS made a specific appeal to the maritime industry and mariners who are required to respond to emergencies. It said that seafarers transiting the Mediterranean would be especially affected by the numbers of refugees crossing from Libya to Italy after projects like the Italian mission Mare Nostrum were no longer in operation.

2015 mission in the Central Mediterranean

MOAS continued to operate in the Central Mediterranean Sea from May to September 2015, during which time it assisted almost 9,000 refugees, bringing its total number of rescues until the end of 2015 to 12,000.

Doctors Without Borders partnered with MOAS from May to September 2015 on board the MY Phoenix where they cared for 6,985 people rescued at sea after rescue by MOAS. The 6 person team included a logistician, a communications specialist, and medical staff who cared for migrants on board the Phoenix. Rescued people suffered from a range conditions including from dehydration and gunshot wounds.

Mission in the Aegean Sea: December 2015 to March 2016

MOAS funding raising revenue was significantly increased following an increase in public awareness of the need for sea rescue in the aftermath of t hedeath of Alan Kurdi, enabling MOAS to expand its work to the Aegean Sea between December 2015 and April 2016.

On 2 January, it announced that it has assisted a boat of 39 migrants, 11 of whom were injured by the violent impact on the sharp island rocks. A three-month old infant boy was severely hypothermic and was stabilized. On 12 January 2016, MOAS assisted a vessel of Syrian refugees who had washed ashore on the island of Agathonisi. The group included a two-year-old boy who became the first known migrant casualty that year.

For this mission, MOAS used the Topaz Responder, a 51-meter custom-made emergency response vessel, which hosts two high-speed rescue launches. These smaller rescue vessels are named Alan and Galip, in honour of the Kurdi brothers.

In April 2016, the sharp fall in attempted crossings in the aftermath of the EU-Turkey deal and unfolding mass tragedies in the Central Mediterranean prompted the repositioning of all MOAS assets to the Central Mediterranean.

2016 mission in the Central Mediterranean

MOAS launched its 2016 Central Mediterranean operation on 6 June, rescuing and assisting over 20,000 people in 2016, during which MOAS' search and rescue vessels operated in international waters 12-16 nautical miles off the coast of Libya. The 2016 Mission was run in conjunction with operational partners Red Cross Italy, who provided vital medical and psychosocial assistance, cultural mediation, food, clothing and emergency resources to the beneficiaries while they were on board.

2017 mission in the Central Mediterranean
MOAS launched its 2017 Central Mediterranean operation on 1 April using the Phoenix and with their own medical team, and supported by a manned drone. Over the Easter Weekend Rescue, MOAS' crew members rescued an estimated 1,500 people.

In September 2017, MOAS announced the ending of their missions in the Mediterranean, in order to divert resources to assisting Myanmar's threatened Rohingya group of Muslims.

Myanmar and Bangladesh
MOAS arrived in Bangladesh on 3 September 2017 to conduct a needs assessment of the unfolding humanitarian crisis. On 1 October 2017 the Phoenix completed the first of two aid deliveries, transporting of 40 tonnes of food.

MOAS has established two field clinics where Rohingya refugees can receive primary and secondary medical care and where the host Bangladeshi community can access our emergency services. The first clinic was opened 14 October 2017 in the fishing community of Shamlapur, near where refugees arrive by sea, the second was opened on 10 November 2017 to serve the remote refugee settlement of Unchiprang.

The clinics offer provide triage, pharmacy, reproductive, maternal neonatal and pediatrics health services. Each clinic has a recovery suite, a maternity room, a surgical area, and an ambulance.

The clinics are staffed with doctors, nurses, midwives, pharmacists and logisticians, and treat up to 300 people every day for conditions including trauma, acute respiratory illnesses, gastric distress, malnutrition and fatigue. Over 40% of their patients are children.

Funding
Since 2015, MOAS has been funded via public donations, institutional grants, and corporate sponsorship. Operational partners, such as Doctors without Borders, the Italian Red Cross, and the International Federation of the Red Cross.

In March 2016 the Global Impact network announced to have collected about US$1.5 Million for MOAS.

See also
 Hellenic Rescue Team
 Iuventa
 Mediterranea Saving Humans
 No Border network
 Proactiva Open Arms
 Sea Watch
 SOS Méditerranée

References

External links
Official Website

Charities based in Malta
Social welfare charities
Sea rescue organizations
Migrant boat disasters in Europe
Foreign charities operating in Bangladesh
Humanitarian aid organizations in Europe
Organizations established in 2013
Non-governmental organizations
Organisations based in Malta